The 1984 Virginia State Elections took place on Election Day, November 6, 1984, the same day as the U.S. Presidential, U.S. Senate, and U.S. House elections in the state. The only statewide elections on the ballot were two constitutional referendums  to amend the Virginia State Constitution. Because Virginia state elections are held on off-years, no statewide officers or state legislative elections were held. All referendums were referred to the voters by the Virginia General Assembly.

Question 1

This amendment asked voters to permit members of local governing bodies to be elected or appointed to vacancies in the office of mayor or board chairman.

Question 2

This amendment asked voters to add a Balanced Budget Amendment to the state constitution.

References

1984 Virginia elections